Allen Austin Bartholomew (23 October 1925 – 19 June 2004) was an Australian forensic psychologist and criminologist who played a major role in developing criminology in Australia. For example, he negotiated with the University of Melbourne to establish both the Australian and New Zealand Society of Criminology (ANZSOC) and its official journal, the Australian and New Zealand Journal of Criminology, in 1967. He went on to serve as the journal's first editor-in-chief from 1968 to 1980.

In his honor, the ANZSOC and SAGE Publications jointly honor the best article published in the Australian and New Zealand Journal of Criminology in a given year with the Allen Austin Bartholomew Award.

References

External links
Biography at ANZSOC website

1925 births
2004 deaths
Australian criminologists
People educated at Caterham School
Forensic psychiatrists
Australian psychiatrists
Academic staff of Monash University
Academic staff of the University of Melbourne
Academic journal editors